Damián París (born November 21, 1990 in Argentina) is an Argentine footballer currently playing for Club Sol de Mayo of the Torneo Argentino B.

Teams
  Racing de Trelew 2011-2012
  Naval 2013 
  Racing de Trelew 2013-2014
  Club Sol de Mayo 2014–

External links
 
 

1990 births
Living people
Argentine footballers
Argentine expatriate footballers
Naval de Talcahuano footballers
Primera B de Chile players
Expatriate footballers in Chile
Association footballers not categorized by position